VPB-99 was a Patrol Bombing Squadron of the U.S. Navy. The squadron was established as Patrol Bombing Squadron 99 (VPB-99) on 5 January 1945 and disestablished on 15 January 1946.

Operational history
5 January 1945: VPB-99 was established at NAS Alameda, California, as a PBM training squadron under the operational control of FAW-8. The mission of the squadron was to complete the training of PBM replacement crews that had finished the basic course at NAAS Banana River, Florida, or NAS Corpus Christi, Texas. The sister squadron to this unit was VPB-98 at NAS San Diego, California.
1 May – 31 July 1945: Between 19 and 30 crews per month were ferried to NAS Kaneohe Bay, Hawaii, upon completion of the course syllabus. This ceased with the end of combat patrols after 10 August and the Surrender of Japan.
September 1945: Personnel were reorganized in the squadron to permit rapid demobilization of those who could be spared.
15 January 1946: VPB-99 was disestablished at NAS Alameda.

Aircraft assignments
The squadron was assigned the following aircraft, effective on the dates shown:
 PBM-3D - January 1945
 PBM-5D - January 1945

Home port assignments
The squadron was assigned to these home ports, effective on the dates shown:
 NAS Alameda, California - 5 January 1945

See also

 Maritime patrol aircraft
 List of inactive United States Navy aircraft squadrons
 List of United States Navy aircraft squadrons
 List of squadrons in the Dictionary of American Naval Aviation Squadrons
 History of the United States Navy

References

Patrol squadrons of the United States Navy
Wikipedia articles incorporating text from the Dictionary of American Naval Aviation Squadrons